Julian Aldrin Pasha (born July 22, 1969 in Bandar Lampung, Lampung) is an Indonesian politician. Julian Pasha was the Presidential Spokesman of Indonesia replacing Andi Mallarangeng during the reign of President Susilo Bambang Yudhoyono in Second United Indonesia Cabinet. He was previously a guest lecturer at several universities in Tokyo. He was also Head of Political Science Department Faculty of Social and Political Sciences of the University of Indonesia.

References 

1969 births
People from Lampung
Lampung people
Indonesian politicians
Living people